Christ Cathedral may refer to:

Christ Cathedral (Garden Grove, California), part of the Roman Catholic Diocese of Orange in Orange County, California, formerly the Crystal Cathedral 
Christ Cathedral (Salina, Kansas), listed on the National Register of Historic Places

See also
 Christ Church Cathedral (disambiguation)